Thando Mdodana (born 18 November 1986) is a South African cricketer. He played in six first-class and two List A matches from 2006 to 2012.

References

External links
 

1986 births
Living people
South African cricketers
Boland cricketers
Western Province cricketers
Cricketers from Cape Town